Scaevola parvifolia (common name - camel weed) is an erect, many stemmed perennial in the family Goodeniaceae, which is native to Western Australia, the Northern Territory, Queensland and South Australia. It grows to a height of 0.6 m, and its blue-purple flowers may be seen from March to October.

Description 
Scaevola parvifolia is an, erect, many-stemmed perennial growing to 60 cm tall, with hairs at 90°; stems scarcely striate. The basal leaves have no stalks, are linear to lanceolate, entire, with leaf blades 18–35 mm long by 3–6 mm wide. The leaves on the stems, however,  are ovate to linear, with blades which are 1.5 to 27 mm long. The inflorescences are thyrses (compound inflorescences ending in a vegetative bud and with mixed types of branching  with the main axis bearing several or many lateral cymes), which are up  to 40 cm long. The bracts are leafy and the flower stalk is up to 6.5 cm long. The sepals are  triangular  and free (or join only at the base). The blue to white corolla is 13–32 mm long, with hairs on the outside, and bearded inside.  The fruit is ellipsoidal is 4–8 mm long, is hairy, has striations, and tubercles (small wart-like outgrowths).

Distribution and habitat
It is found in the arid regions of Western Australia, central Australia and Queensland, growing on red sand, clay or loamy soils, on sandplains & dunes.

Taxonomy and etymology
It was first described and named by Ferdinand von Mueller in 1868, and its specific epithet, parvifolia, is derived from the Latin, parvus ("small") and  folium ("leaf") thereby giving an adjective which describes the plant as "small-leaved".

Gallery

References

parvifolia
Eudicots of Western Australia
Asterales of Australia
Plants described in 1868
Taxa named by Ferdinand von Mueller
Taxa named by George Bentham